Pear is an unincorporated community in Raleigh County, West Virginia, United States.

John Pear Buckland, an early postmaster, gave the community his name.

References 

Unincorporated communities in West Virginia
Unincorporated communities in Raleigh County, West Virginia